Présentation ou Charlotte et son steak is a French short drama film written and directed by Éric Rohmer in 1951 and post-synchronised in 1961. It features Jean-Luc Godard and the voices of Stéphane Audran and Anna Karina.

Plot
In a Swiss village in winter, Walter is walking with Charlotte when they meet Clara. Walter hopes Charlotte will be jealous of Clara's good looks and become more interested in him. When Clara parts from them, Charlotte goes into her house and Walter follows her, though she does not want him to. Offering him food, which he refuses, she fries herself a steak and gives him a piece. He asks for a kiss and she refuses. She starts talking about Clara, who Walter says is more beautiful yet it is Charlotte he prefers. She does not believe him but notices that he is shivering, on which she hugs and kisses him. Then he walks her to her train.

Cast
Jean-Luc Godard as Walter
Anne Couderet as Charlotte (voiced by Stéphane Audran)
Andrée Bertrand as Clara (voiced by Anna Karina)

Production
Though Rohmer shot the film in 1951, it was not until 1961 that it was blown up from 16mm stock to 35mm with an added soundtrack, and then released at the Journées internationales du court métrage.

Reception
The film is considered a precursor of the Nouvelle Vague, being shot on location in black-and-white with hand-held camera and amateur actors and, in Godard and Rohmer, uniting two major figures of the movement.

References

External links
 

French drama short films
Films directed by Éric Rohmer
1951 films
French black-and-white films
1951 drama films
1950s French films